Louisiana State University Health Sciences Center Shreveport (LSU Health Shreveport) is a public university focused on the health sciences and located in Shreveport, Louisiana. It is part of the LSU System and is composed of three different schools: the School of Medicine, School of Graduate Studies, and School of Allied Health Professions. The School of Medicine offers the Doctor of Medicine degree, while both the Schools of Graduate Studies and Allied Health offer Bachelor's degrees, Master's degrees, and Doctorate degrees. The Ochsner-LSU Health Hospital also offers 18 residency programs and 15 fellowships.

History

It is part of the Louisiana State University System. It was established as the Louisiana State University School of Medicine at Shreveport in 1966; Edgar Hull – who in 1931 had worked to establish the Medical Center of Louisiana at New Orleans – was the first dean, from 1966 until he retired in 1973. G. E. Ghali was named Chancellor of LSU Health Shreveport in October 2016.

Since 2016, the LSU medical school in Shreveport has grappled with financial troubles. LSU President F. King Alexander said that the troubles date to 2013, when the private Biomedical Research Foundation of Northwest Louisiana assumed control of the teaching hospital as part of then-Governor Bobby Jindal's plan to privatize the state charity hospital system. Alexander said that the foundation has not paid hospital bills in full and provides insufficient funding to sustain the medical school.

In October 2018, a 50/50 partnership between Ochsner and LSU Health Shreveport took over managing the operations, replacing the previous management.

Academics 
LSU Health Shreveport's three professional schools (Medicine, Graduate Studies, and Allied Health Professions) offer multiple degree paths.

School of Medicine 
The School of Medicine only offers the MD degree, but some students elect to join the rigorous combined MD–PhD program.

School of Graduate Studies 
The school of graduate studies offers master's degrees, PhDs, and takes part in a combined MD-PhD program with the School of Medicine.

School of Allied Health Professions 
Allied Health has the widest arrangement of academic degrees, with undergraduate and graduate programs. It also offers three residency programs.

References

External links
 Official website

Medical schools in Louisiana
Universities and colleges accredited by the Southern Association of Colleges and Schools
Universities and colleges in Shreveport, Louisiana
Health Sciences Center Shreveport
Schools of public health in the United States
Buildings and structures in Shreveport, Louisiana